The British Columbia Derby is a Canadian Thoroughbred horse race run annually in September at Hastings Racecourse (formerly Exhibition Park) in Vancouver, British Columbia.

History
Prior to 1961 (with the exception of 1949 and 1956), the BC Derby was run at Lansdowne Park Racetrack in Richmond, British Columbia. The BC Derby was not run in 2020 or 2021 owing to factors relating to the Covid 19 pandemic. 

Open to three-year-old horses, the Grade III is run on dirt at a distance of  miles (9 furlongs) and currently (2022) offers a purse of CDN$125,000, the richest and most important race at Hastings Racecourse.

Winners since 1990

Earlier winners from 1946

1989 - Fleet Reserve
1988 - Regal Intention
1987 - Irish Bear
1986 - Fortinbras
1985 - Imperial Choice
1984 - Lets Go Blue
1983 - Prairie Breaker
1982 - Travelling Victor
1981 - Tempos Tiger
1980 - Ensign Earnem 
1979 - Pole Position
1978 - Five Star General
1977 – Bucksaw
1976 - DBS Dream
1975 - Auguste
1974 - Norland
1973 - Kokos Pal 
1972 - Decidedly D 
1971 - Command Module
1970 - Mincemeat
1969 - Essence Of Time
1968 - Treasures Glory
1967 - Ahead Tiger
1966 - Bright Monarch
1965 - Hanko
1964 - George Royal
1963 - Feasible
1962 - Enchalade
1961 - Black Balladier 
1960 - Collin Baykey 
1959 - KY Music
1958 - Major Turley
1957 - Donn Baykey
1956 - Ali Miss
1955 - My Ladylove
1954 - Quality Quest
1953 - Liege
1952 - Battened Down
1951 - Eddie's Boy
1950 - Sco
1949 - Ab Jr.
1948 - Ohsodry
1947 - Cisalworth
1946 - Pacific Pearl

See also
 List of Canadian flat horse races

References

 The British Columbia Derby at Pedigree Query
 The 2008 British Columbia Derby at the NTRA

Graded stakes races in Canada
Horse races in Canada
Flat horse races for three-year-olds
Sport in Vancouver